Lilin Station, previously known as Fengnan, is a railway station on the TRA Taichung line located in Tanzi District, Taichung, Taiwan. It opened on 28 October 2018.

Name
Lilin Station was originally planned as Fengnan station (meaning "south of Fengyuan"). However, the station is located within Lilin Village, Tanzi District, not Fengyuan District. In July 2014, the station was renamed Lilin Station.

See also
 List of railway stations in Taiwan

References

2018 establishments in Taiwan
Railway stations in Taichung
Railway stations opened in 2018
Railway stations served by Taiwan Railways Administration